Act II is the ninth studio album by Japanese band Tokio. It was released on February 2, 2005. The album reached third place on the Oricon weekly chart and charted for seven weeks.

Track listing

Use in popular media
 "Ambitious Japan!" was used in the video game Donkey Konga 2: Hit Song Parade.
 "Love Love Manhattan" was used in the Japanese TV series Manhattan Love Story.
 "Ambitious Japan!" is using right now in JR Central Tokaido Shinkansen announcement melody.

References

2005 albums
Tokio (band) albums